The 1996 WAFU Club Championship was the 18th  football club tournament season that took place for the runners-up or third place of each West African country's domestic league, the West African Club Championship. It was won again by Niger's military team ASFAN Niamey after defeating East End Lions in the second leg.  The club appearance was the lowest in WAFU history which had only four clubs, one each, from Ivory Coast, Niger, Sierra Leone and Senegal. A total of about 16 goals were scored, more than half less than last season.  Originally a 22 match season, only six matches were played.

Semifinals

|}

Finals

|}

Winners

See also
1996 African Cup of Champions Clubs
1996 CAF Cup Winners' Cup
1996 CAF Cup

References

External links
Full results of the 1996 WAFU Club Championship at RSSSF

West African Club Championship
1996 in African football